The 1879 Gladstone by-election was a by-election held  on 3 January 1879 in the  electorate during the 6th New Zealand Parliament.

The by-election was caused by the death of the incumbent Frederick Teschemaker on 21 November 1878.

He was replaced by John Studholme.

Studholme was the only candidate, so was declared elected unopposed. Another candidate, Mr Buckingham had withdrawn. Studholme was described as a strong opponent of the Grey Ministry.

References 

Gladstone 1879
1879 elections in New Zealand
January 1879 events
Politics of Canterbury, New Zealand